Andreas Kempf (14 March 1881 – 29 March 1963) was a Swiss gymnast. He competed in three events at the 1904 Summer Olympics in Missouri.

References

External links
 

1881 births
1963 deaths
Swiss male artistic gymnasts
Olympic gymnasts of the United States
Gymnasts at the 1904 Summer Olympics
Sportspeople from Basel-Stadt